The African Archery Championship (French : Championnats d'Afrique de tir à l'arc) is the Archery Top African tournament held every two years, Ruled and managed by The Federation of African Archery.

Summary of championships

References

External links
www.africanarchery.org/

 
Archery in Africa
International archery competitions
African championships
Recurring sporting events established in 2000
2000 establishments in Africa